Aleksandr Aleksandrovich Kuznetsov (born 22 July 1992) is a Ukrainian-born Russian actor. He has had prominent roles in Russian films and television.

Early life
Aleksandr Kuznetsov was born on July 22, 1992, in Sevastopol, Ukraine. Kuznetsov felt creatively limited in Sevastopol and moved first to Kyiv and then Moscow to pursue his education.

Career
In 2015, he graduated from the  Russian Institute of Theatre Arts – GITIS and was invited to join several leading Moscow theaters. He chose the Chekhov Moscow Art Theatre where he started as a leading actor the same year. In addition to film and television, he has performed in numerous theater productions, including "The Rebels" (2017), directed by Aleksandr Molochnikov, and "Oh, late love" (2014), directed by D. Krimov. He also directed and starred in his own production, "The Gamblers (IGQKI)" at the Na Strastnom Theatrical Center (2015).

In television and cinema, Kuznetsov is currently best known for his roles in the Russian Netflix television series Better Than Us, and the films Why Don’t You Just Die? (Papa, sdokhni), directed by Kirill Sokolov, and Leto, directed by Kirill Serebrennikov, which was selected to compete for the Palme d'Or at the 2018 Cannes Film Festival. Considered a fast rising star in Russian Cinema, critics have been mostly positive about his performances. For his leading role in Kislota (ACID) directed by Alexander Gorchilin, Alexander received an Angela Award at the SUBTITLE Spotlight European Film Festival.

In the fall of 2018, Kuznetsov won a "New Names (in Cinema)" Award at the OK! Magazine awards ceremony (Russia).

In 2019, Kuznetsov has been cast in a leading role in Our Men. The French feature film, which will be directed by Rachel Lang, also stars French actor Louis Garrel.

In 2021, Kuznetsov appeared as Krysztof in the HBO Max drama series Kamikaze. Directed by Kaspar Munk, the 8-part series is based on the Norwegian novel, Muleum, by Erlend Loe. 

In 2022, Kuznetsov plays the role of Helmut in Fantastic Beasts: The Secrets of Dumbledore directed by David Yates and produced by Steve Kloves.

Aleksandr is represented by Subtitle Talent Agency.

Personal life
Apart from his acting career, Kuznetsov is also the frontman of his band Space Punk Industry. He is currently working on their first album. Aleksandr describes his music as a mix of "britpop and alternative".

Kuznetsov has criticized the Russian invasion of Ukraine.

Filmography

Film

Television

Awards and nominations

References

External links
 Aleksandr Kuznetsov on Subtitle Talent
 
 Aleksandr Kuznetsov's Instagram
 Aleksandr Kuznetsov's Facebook

1992 births
Living people
People from Sevastopol
Russian male film actors
Russian male television actors
Russian male stage actors
Russian male actors
21st-century Russian male actors